The Democratic Front for Eritrean Unity (DFEU) is a rebel group currently fighting the Eritrean government. They are allied with the Red Sea Afar Democratic Organisation (RSADO), with whom they have done joint operations.

References

Guerrilla organizations
National liberation movements in Africa
Rebel groups in Eritrea
Rebel groups in Ethiopia